Henoticus californicus is a species of silken fungus beetle in the family Cryptophagidae. It is found in Central America, North America, and Europe.

References

Further reading

 

Cryptophagidae
Articles created by Qbugbot
Beetles described in 1843